WCTZ-LD, virtual and UHF digital channel 35, is a low-powered Buzzr-affiliated television station. While nominally licensed to Bowling Green, Kentucky, United States, this station serves the Nashville, Tennessee, viewing area. The station is owned by Innovate Corporation. WCTZ-LD's transmitter is located in Whites Creek, Tennessee.

History 
The station’s construction permit was initially issued on December 8, 2009, under the calls of W35CT-D, when it was under the original ownership of Madison Avenue Ventures. The current WCTZ-LD calls were assigned on May 29, 2013. The station was sold to DTV America on August 20, 2013.

WCTZ was one of several dozen DTV America stations that were purchased by HC2 Holdings (now Innovate Corp.) in October 2017.

It was not until May 1, 2019, when WCTZ officially signed on. The station simulcast sister station WKUW-LD's seven digital subchannels until September 20, 2019, when WKUW became a sister translator station to WJFB, broadcasting its five subchannels.

On February 21, 2020, WCTZ replaced Soul of the South Television with Three Angels Broadcasting Network on DT3, while they also replaced Jewelry Television with Infomercials on DT7. Three months later on May 18, 2020, DT3 and DT7 changed again, with WCTZ replacing 3ABN with a mixture of localized classic TV Shows (Which are mainly in Public Domain) and Infomercials on DT3; and the Infomercials which ran on DT7 were replaced with NBCUniversal-owned LX.

On July 21, 2020, WCTZ replaced the infomercials on DT5, with Cheddar, a financial news channel, as part of a groupwide station agreement with WCTZ's parent owner (HC2 Holdings), and the network itself. The carriage agreement with WCTZ and Cheddar expired as of May 2020. At that point, Cheddar was replaced with the Spanish feed of beIN Sports. (beIN Sports Xtra en Español) 

It was announced on February 24, 2021, that Tegna Inc. would launch Twist, a network that specializes in factual lifestyle and reality television content aimed at females between the ages of 25 and 54. WCTZ would become one of the new affiliate stations to launch the network on April 5, replacing the localized programming on its third subchannel.

Digital television

Digital channels
The station's digital signal is multiplexed:

Former affiliations

References

External links
DTV America

WCTZ-LD REC Broadcast Query

Low-power television stations in the United States
Innovate Corp.
CTZ-LD
Television channels and stations established in 2009
2009 establishments in Kentucky
Buzzr affiliates
Twist (TV network) affiliates
LX (TV network) affiliates